Anna Vandenhoeck (1709–1787), was a German printer.   She managed the printing shop Vandenhoeck & Ruprecht  in Göttingen after the death of her spouse Abraham Vandenhoeck in 1751 to 1787, a printing shop famous for publishing a great number of the well known literature of the Age of Enlightenment.

References

1709 births
1787 deaths
18th-century German businesswomen
18th-century German businesspeople
18th-century printers
German printers